Eber is an ancestor of the Israelites and the Ishmaelites in the Hebrew Bible.

Eber may also refer to:


Personal name
Eber Finn, a legendary early Irish king
Éber Bessa (born 1992), Brazilian footballer
E. W. Cave (1831–1904), American journalist, civic promoter and politician, Secretary of State of Texas (1859–1861)
John W. Eber (1895–?), American politician in the 1920s

Places
Eber, Ohio, United States, an unincorporated community
Eber, Çay, Turkey, a village
Lake Eber, Turkey, a fresh water lake

Other
EBER, proteins and RNA found in the Epstein-Barr virus
SMS Eber (1887), a German gunboat lost in 1889
Eber, a programme exploring tank improvements - see Leopard 1

See also
Éber Donn or Donn, a god in Irish mythology
Ebers,a surname
Heber (disambiguation)